Many areas of Vietnam are under protection. While the national reserves cover small areas of scientific significance with restricted access, the national parks also cover wetlands of Ramsar designated areas and BirdLife International inscribed bird areas. The largest of the national parks initially covered were the Cúc Phương National Park, the Cát Tiên National Park, and the Côn Đảo National Park  which to start with were forest areas cum reserves or prohibited areas. The objective for creating national parks was to allow access to the reserved areas as a part of ecotourism and cultural needs with full attention to the basic approach of conservation of natural environmental resources.

The national parks and reserves, as per present status, (as reported by the National Parks of Vietnam) conforming to the topography of the country which cover terrestrial, deltas of rivers, and coastal zones are: Five national parks and four reserves in the Mekong Delta; two national parks in the northeastern area; five reserves in the north western area; three parks in the Red River Delta; two parks and one reserve in the North Central Coastal area; two reserves in South Central Coastal area; three parks and one reserve in Central Highlands; one park and one reserve in south eastern area.

Legislation
The earliest enabling law passed was the principal legal and regulatory framework for Special Use Forests in the 1986 Decision of the Minister of Forestry. Under the Decision 1171/QD of 1986, protected areas broadly categorized were: Category I: National Parks, Category II: Nature Reserves and Cultural, Historical and Environmental Areas. IUCN guidelines of 1978 formed the basic principle. In 1986 alone, seven National Parks, 49 Nature Reserves and 31 Cultural, Historical and Environment Areas came to be established.

Under the January 2001 new regulation, Decision No. 08/QD-TTg, Article 7 of Decision 08/2001 for the management of Special
Use Forests (further elaborations have been defined) three sub-zones have been spelt out. These are; strictly protected; ecological rehabilitation areas; and service and administrative – the last sub-zone has provision for not only management specific facilities but also envisages research facilities, tourism, recreation facilities, and entertainment aspects.

Having signed the Convention on International Trade in Endangered Species of Wild Fauna and Flora (CITES) also known as Washington Convention and the Cartagena Protocol, Vietnam has made changes in its laws and regulations from time to time to keep pace with the changing scenario of wildlife trade practices.

National Parks

Cúc Phương National Park
It was established in 1982. It is located in the foothills of the northern Annamite Mountains. Flora in the park includes multi-layered canopy of trees which rise up to  height and  flowers, including orchids, ferns with tall leaves. The fauna consists of 97 species of mammals (including notable endangered langurs), 300 species of birds, 36 reptilian species, 17 species of amphibians, 11 species of fish, 2,000 species of vascular plants, and thousands of species of insects. Remnants of 12,000 years old prehistoric man have been discovered in the caves, and also fossilised marine reptiles (the first of its kind in Vietnam)

Yok Đôn National Park

Yok Đôn National Park was established in 1988. Vegetation in the park consists of deciduous forest and semi-evergreen (mixed deciduous) forest, with smaller areas of evergreen forest, particularly on hills and along watercourses. 474 vascular plant species have been recorded in the park. Globally endangered species such as Indochinese tiger, leopard, Asian elephant and gaur are also reported. Wild elephants are tamed here, which is tourist attraction.

Cát Tiên National Park

Cát Tiên National Park was declared as a national park in 1998. It has an area of about protects one of the largest areas of lowland tropical rainforests left in Vietnam. Vegetation consists of evergreen tropical and deciduous forest, dominated by Dipterocarpaceae, Fabaceae and Lythraceae (particularly Lagerstroemia spp.), with 40% of the park bamboo woodland, and the remaining 10% farmland, wetlands and grassland. It has 1,300 species of vascular plants. In 1992, it was  made a Rhinoceros Reserve upon the discovery of a population of the Vietnamese Javan rhinoceros, but these had died out by 2010. In addition 76 mammal, 320 bird, 74 reptile, 35 amphibian, 99 fish and 435 butterfly species have been recorded in the park. Siamese crocodile (Crocodylus siamensis), a globally threatened species is also reported from the park.

Phong Nha-Kẻ Bàng National Park

Phong Nha-Kẻ Bàng National Park was declared a national park in 2001. It also protects the ecosystem of limestone forest of the Annamite Range region in north central coast of Vietnam. It is also an UNESCO World Heritage Site, inscribed in 2003. The forest cover in the park is of the order of 96.2% of primary forest. In April 2009, a group of cave explorers from the British Caving Association conducted surveys in this park and adjacent areas. With these dimensions, Sơn Đoòng cave overtakes Deer Cave in Malaysia to take the title of the world's largest cave.

Lò Gò-Xa Mát National Park
It was declared a national park in 1993. Tree species in this forest type is high, with the Fabaceae, Dipterocarpaceae, Meliace conifer species, Burseraceae, Myrtaceae and Anacardiaceae families. Lower montane evergreen forest, reptile and amphibian species have been recorded here. It is an Important Bird Area.

Cát Bà National Park

It also  encompasses  a few small islands and marine areas of the east of Cat Ba island. Primarily a limestone forest area, it has 839 vascular plant species which include 25 species which are listed in the Red Data Book of Vietnam. It is the only park in the world where Cat Ba langur (Trachypithecus poliocephalus) species is reported. Some species of snails are also reported.

Phú Quốc National Park
It was gazetted as national park in June 2001. Vegetation in park is mostly of consists of lowland evergreen forest; 929 plant species have been recorded so far. other wildlife data are yet to be evaluated.

Tam Đảo National Park

Vegetation in the park has high concentration of tree species in the families of  Fabaceae, Dipterocarpaceae, Meliaceae, Burseraceae, Myrtaceae and Anacardiaceae. It is an important Bird Area with many biome-restricted bird species such as blue-naped pitta (nipalensis), purple cochoa (purpurea), chestnut-headed tesia (castaneocoronata), pale-footed bush warbler (Cettia pallidipes) and greater rufous-headed parrotbill (Paradoxornis ruficeps). It is rich with a variety of insect species, as also many species of reptiles and amphibians.

Ba Vì National Park
Ba Vi mountain within the park, developed as a hill station is a three-humped peak of Vua, Tan Vien with a temple on top dedicated to the mountain god, and Ngoc Hoa. The mountains rise steeply above the surrounding plain of generally  elevation. Vegetation consists of lowland evergreen forest, lower montane evergreen forest and lower montane mixed coniferous and broad leaf forest and has 812 species of vascular plants. Fauna reported are 44 mammal species, 114 bird species, 15 reptile species and nine amphibian species.

Ba Bể National Park

Ba Bể National Park lies in Bắc Kạn Province. The park lies in the elevation range of  150 to 1,098 m. It has limestone forests (distributed on steep limestone slopes), which are rich in ground flora. The globally vulnerable Owston's civet (Hemigalus owstoni) and François's leaf monkey (Trachypithecus francoisi) are found here. It is also rich in butterfly species, about 332 species are reported. There is also diversity of fish species in the freshwater zones of the park, including endemic species.

Bạch Mã National Park

Its habitat types vary from coastal lagoons to montane forest. The Mount Bạch Mã mountain is located within the park. The main vegetation type reported consists of moist evergreen forest and montane forest and scrub and grasslands. The park has endemic subspecies of silver pheasant (Lophura nycthemera beli) and Edwards's pheasant (Lophura edwardsi). Asian elephant, white-cheeked gibbons and red-shanked douc langurs are the mammal species recorded but detailed list of mammals in the park is yet to be prepared. Of the 43 bird species, endemic species of crested argus, the Annam partridge and Edwards's pheasant are reported.

Chư Yang Sin National Park
It is an Important Bird Area with grey-crowned crocias, which is endemic and also globally endangered. Of the 46 mammal species, black-shanked douc (Pygathrix nigripes) and yellow-cheeked crested gibbon (Hylobates gabriellae) are key species in the park.

Hoàng Liên National Park

About 2,000 species of plants including several red listed species) are reported. Ancient mushroom species are also noted in the high mountain areas bordering China. 66 species of mammals (including black gibbon and silver-cheeked langurs), 41 amphibians and 61 reptile species (includes the rare spike frog) and 347 species of birds.

Bidoup Núi Bà National Park
It is formed mostly of forest area, and is hemmed between two mountain ranges of the Bidoup and the Lang Bian. It is also well known for its richness of endemic species of flora and fauna. Of the 1468 species of plants, 62 are rare species spread under 29  plant families and recorded  in the Red Book 2000 of Vietnam. It is a store house of 250  species of wild orchids. The list of rare animals includes 52 species. The grey-crowned crocias, black-hooded laughingthrush and collared laughingthrush are the commonly seen bird species in the park.

Xuân Thủy National Park

It was officially gazetted as a park in 2003. Located in the submerged coastal zone of the Red River Delta, it has been declared as a Ramsar Wetland site. It has 120 species of vascular plants and 111 species of water plants. As a migratory bird habitat, it is a staging and wintering area for shorebirds, gulls and waterfowl in the coastal zone of the Red River Delta. Some of the popular bird species in the park are the Asian dowitcher, Nordmann's greenshank, spoon-billed sandpiper, Saunders's gull and black-faced spoonbill. The park is facing threat on account of aquaculture and high levels of fishing. Shellfish harvesting is also practiced within its boundaries.

Pù Mát National Park

Pu Mat Mountain is located within the park. It is a national park since November 2001. It is a lowland evergreen forest with 2,461 plant species. Considered as the flagship park, its location is on the Truong Son Mountains, the northern massif, bordering Laos. Saola (Pseudoryx nghetinhensis) was new genus of large mammal discovered in the park. Endemic mammals recorded are five and these are: northern white-cheeked gibbon, red-shanked douc, Truong Son muntjac and Annamite striped rabbit. Other wildlife flora and fauna reported are 896 flora species, 241 mammal species, 137 bird species, 25 reptiles and 15 amphibians. It is also known as "Vietnam's great museum of animal gene pool".

Côn Đảo National Park

Forest and forestland cover  and a biodiversity marine protected area covers the remaining . The largest of the three islands is Côn Sơn. It was gazetted as a national park on 31 March 1993. Rain forest in the land area to mangroves in the bay is the transition of forest type in the park. There are 882 vascular plant species, 91 species of medicinal plants; 44 plant species that were discovered for the first time on the islands. A number of these species are named with the suffix of Con Dao as Dipterocarpus condorensis, Ilex condorensis, Pavetta condorensis and Psychotria condorensis. Other fauna reported consist of 24 species of mammal, 69 species of bird and 42 species of reptile and amphibian.

In addition, the marine fauna and flora are of 1,323 species including 44 species in the Red Data Book of Vietnam. The park has the richest diversity of 153 species of mollusc species, reported to be the highest for any island in Vietnam. Seagrass beds are also part of the offshore flora that supports a few globally threatened marine mammals such as dugong. A heritage site within the limits of the park, spread over a  area, has many prisons which were part of the French colonial rule and of South Vietnamese regime.

Vũ Quang National Park
The Vũ Quang National Park was formerly the Vũ Quang Nature Reserve. The park has 36 endemic subspecies of plants of the North Truong Son forests. It is home for 60 species of mammals, 187 birds, 38 reptiles, 26 amphibians and 56 species of fish; of these 26 species of mammals, 10 species of birds, 16 species of cattle are rare requiring protection. Particular faunal species of note are the brown monkey langur, Hatinh langur, golden-cheeked gibbon, saola, and large cobra.

Núi Chúa National Park

The park was established in 2010. It also has the coastal and marine habitats which are reported to be in good condition. The unique original vegetation which consisted of a mixture of evergreen forest, semi-evergreen forest and deciduous forest has been mostly denuded due over exploitation in the early 1990s. The beach where the sea turtle nestle is located on a promontory bordering a marine park with coral reefs; 11 species of turtles, both terrestrial and marine are recorded. Global conservation concerns are serious in view of anthropological pressures in the area particularly for black-shanked douc (Pygathrix nigripes) highest number in Vietnam, pygmy loris (Nycticebus pygmaeus), Asian black bear (Ursus thibetanus), sun bear (U. malayanus), large-antlered muntjac Muntiacus vuquangensis and Siamese fireback (Lophura diardi). The total Fauna recorded in the park consist of 72 mammal species and 181 bird species. Bats are also common; Cynopterus brachyotis is the endangered species out of a total of 12 species.

Xuân Sơn National Park

The park has 726 vascular species of 475 genera; of these 52 species belong to the conifer branch. Flora system also include chestnut, oak and magnolia as also medicinal plants, particularly bacopa monnieri in abundance. There are 365 faunal species, which include 46 species listed in Vietnam's Red Book and 18 species are listed in the World Red Book.

Nature reserves

The protection of biodiversity of Vietnam was started with establishing nature reserves of which many have been converted to parks. There are still 14 Nature Reserves, which are distributed over the total land area of the country, including coastal zones. These are: Cần Giờ Biosphere Reserve in South Eastern area; Kon Cha Rang Nature Reserve in Central Highlands; Ba Na Nui Chua Nature Reserve and Cu Lao Cham Nature Reserve in south central region; the Pu Luong Nature Reserve in north central area; the Muong Nhe Nature Reserve, the Pa Co-Hang Kia Nature Reserve, the Sop Cop Nature Reserve, the Thuong Tien Nature Reserve and the Xuan Nha Nature Reserve in north western area; and the Lung Ngoc Hoang Nature Reserve, the Nui Cam Nature Reserve, the Thanh Phu Nature Reserve, and the Vo Doi Nature Reserve in the Mekong Delta.  There is also the Tây Yên Tử Nature Reserve in Sơn Động District, Bắc Giang Province, in northeastern Vietnam.

See also
List of national parks of Vietnam
Wildlife of Vietnam

References

 
Geography of Vietnam
Vietnam
Natural history of Vietnam
Tourist attractions in Vietnam